In Romania the driving licence is a governmental right given to those who request a licence for any of the categories they desire. It is required for every type of motorized vehicle. The minimum age to obtain a driving licence is 18 years. Regardless of age, in the first year after obtaining the licence the driver is called a beginner and has to display on the windscreen and the back window of the car the distinctive sign (a black exclamation mark (!) on a yellow disk).

Beginning with 1999, the driving licence format was changed from that of a pink booklet to a credit-card sized card.

Obtaining a drivers licence

The driving licence can be obtained after finishing a driving school and passing a two-stage test, a theory test and a road test.

The theory test

Driving license, increasingly difficult to obtain! The theory test consists of 26 computerized questions, time: 30 minutes with successful candidates needing to score a minimum of 22 correct answers to pass. The candidate is automatically eliminated if 5 wrong answers are given. In total, at the national level, only 34.5% of them managed to get their driving license from the first try! Botosani leads the top of the counties with the best passing rate of the driving test "from the first", with 51.49%, followed in the top five by Braila (49.15%), Alba (47.83%) , Suceava (46.38%) and Valcea (45.81%). At the opposite pole, the counties with the lowest passability are Iasi (the lowest passability "from the first", of 19.95%), Arges (22.85%), Mures (24.34%), Vrancea (25.55 %) and Timis (25.62%). Odds are against you! For authenticity, during the computerized examination, the candidate is photographed three times and these pictures are later used as evidence that the person present at the road test is the same person as the one who was present at the theory test.

The road test
The road test is a practical hands-on test that lasts at least 25 minutes and at most 45 minutes, taken with a police officer in the passenger's seat, and using the same car that the candidate learned to drive on. It is required that at least one other candidate must be present in the vehicle, as a witness that all parties acted lawfully during the examination. Starting with July 2017 the exam is also recorded, using a tablet mounted on the windshield.

During the test, the candidate must prove that he/she is able to handle the vehicle properly and safely, while following the road signs and the road law. The examiner may direct the candidate to perform any task that a regular driver may perform: drive in a straight line on a public road, turn left/right in intersections, perform U-turns, overtake other vehicles, lateral park, enter a parking spot in reverse, start (or resume) driving while on an incline etc.

Making a mistake during examination (e.g. failure to use the turn signal before a lane change) will result in "penalty points" for the candidate, amount depending on the severity of the mistake. In order to pass, the candidate must not earn more than 20 points. Causing a "road incident" such as scratching another car during the test, or even touching a curb is reason for immediate failure.

The test ends when the candidate has caused a road incident (result: failure), has accumulated at least 21 penalty points (result: failure), or the maximum examination time has elapsed (result: passed). In case of failure, the candidate can reschedule another examination immediately but must provide proof of doing at least 6 hours of supervised driving.

Categories

A -Vehicle with two wheels (motorcycle) with or without a sidecar or a tricycle that has an engine power over 15 kW.  
AM -Vehicle with two or three wheels having a minimum construction speed of 25 km/h and a maximum speed of 45 km/h, maximum engine capacity of 50CC, or an electric engine with nominal continuous power not exceeding 4 kW, and a mass not exceeding 350 kg, the mass of batteries is not included, in case of electric engine.
A1 -Vehicle with two or three wheels having a maximum engine capacity of 125CC, the maximum engine power of 11 kW and the power/weight ratio must not exceed 0.1 kW/kg.
A2 -Motorcycle with maximum engine power of 35 kW, with the power/weight ratio not exceeding 0.2 Kw/kg and are not derived from a vehicle that has more than double of its power.
B -Vehicle that does not exceed a 3,500 kg authorized mass, has a maximum of 8 seats besides the driver's and is allowed to pull a light-weight trailer not exceeding an authorized mass of 750 kg.
B1 -Vehicle with three or four wheels having a minimum mass of 400 kg and a maximum mass of 550 kg that has an engine larger than 50CC and can achieve a speed greater than 50 km/h.
B+E -A B category vehicle that has a trailer with an authorized mass greater than 750 kg but not exceeding the mass of the pulling vehicle.
C -Vehicle with and authorized mass greater than 3,500 kg and with 8 seats besides the driver's.
C1 -Vehicle that has a mass greater than 3,500 kg but not exceeding 7,500 kg.
C1+E -A C1 category vehicle that has a trailer exceeding 750 kg but the summed mass of the vehicle and trailer does not exceed 12,000 kg.
C+E -A C category vehicle that is allowed to pull a trailer with an authorized mass greater than 750 kg but not exceeding the mass of the pulling vehicle.
D -Vehicle that has more than 8 seats besides the driver's.
D1 -Vehicle that has more than 8 seats besides the driver's but not more than 16 seats.
D1+E -A D1 category vehicle with a trailer exceeding 750 kg but the summed mass of the vehicle and trailer not exceeding 12,000 kg.
D+E -A D category vehicle with a trailer exceeding a 750 kg mass but the trailer must not be used for people transport.
Tr -Tractors and self-propelled working vehicles.
Tb -Trolleybuses
TV -Trams

Age requirement
Every category has a minimum age required for obtaining it: 
AM -16 or over
A -24 (20 if the candidate has at least 2 years experience with A2)
A1 -16 
A2 -18
B -18 
B1 -16
C -21
D -24
Tr -18
Tb -24
TV -24

Gallery 

Beginning with 2009, the driving licence respects the EU format without any English translations anymore which may confuse many non-Romanian language speakers or non-EU residents.

Note
In Romania driving licence document number first and last alpha match to place of issue (abr) of document.e.g.: place of ISSUE- 
doc no.-00406400

See also
 European driving licence

External links
 Romanian road legislation

Romania
Road transport in Romania